The Markup is an American nonprofit news publication focused on the impact of technology on society. Founded in 2018 with the goal of advancing data-driven journalism, the publication is headquartered in New York City.

History 
The Markup was co-founded by two former ProPublica journalists Julia Angwin and Jeff Larson, and executive and journalist Sue Gardner. The project was announced in April 2018, with an expected launch in early 2019. Like ProPublica, all of their content will be licensed under a Creative Commons license.

According to Angwin, in 2018, the portal planned to collect and create public datasets through public records requests, automated data collection, crowdsourcing information, and creating tools.

In April 2019, Gardner fired Angwin as editor-in-chief. Larson was named as her replacement. In a letter to Craig Newmark, The Markup's largest donor, Angwin asked him to intervene, claiming she was pushed out after resisting Gardner's attempts to change The Markup's mission to "one based on advocacy against the tech companies." Six out of seven journalists on staff resigned following Angwin's ouster. Gardner denied changing the mission, telling The New York Times, "We are, pure and simple, a news outlet, we always have been and always will be. Our goals and purpose haven’t changed." According to Larson and Gardner, the reasons for Angwin's ouster had instead included disagreements over the non-journalistic responsibilities of Angwin's role as an executive, such as the organization falling behind in its hiring plans and the launch timeline. A month later, Newmark announced that Gardner and Larson had left The Markup, and there were reports about plans to bring back Angwin as editor-in-chief.

On August 6, 2019, The Markup announced that Julia Angwin would return as editor-in-chief, along with Nabiha Syed as president and much of the original team – but without Larson or Gardner. Syed was previously BuzzFeed’s general counsel and vice president.

Funding 
The Markup received a $20 million gift from Craigslist founder Craig Newmark. The Markup also raised $2 million from the Knight Foundation and an additional $1 million from the Ford Foundation, MacArthur Foundation, and The Ethics and Governance of Artificial Intelligence Initiative.

Coverage and impact

2022 reporting on Meta and tax preparation companies 
In November 2022, an investigation by The Markup revealed that tax filing companies including H&R Block, TaxSlayer, and TaxAct have shared users' financial information with Facebook parent company Meta. In response, a class action lawsuit was filed by H&R Block customers against Meta, who accused the tech company of violating users' privacy rights. Senator Elizabeth Warren and representatives Katie Porter and Brad Sherman sent letters to the tax companies, as well as Meta and Google, to warn against such behavior.

References

External links 
 

2018 establishments in New York City
American journalism organizations
American technology news websites
Data journalism
Mass media companies based in New York City
Mass media companies established in 2018
Mass media in New York City
Non-profit organizations based in New York City
Technology websites